Dienia, commonly called snout orchids, is a genus of six species of orchids in the family Orchidaceae. Plants in this genus are evergreen, mostly terrestrial plants with a fleshy, above ground stem, large, pleated leaves and small, non-resupinate flowers with thin sepals and petals. The labellum is short and tongue-like. The genus is distributed in Southeast Asia, Australia, Micronesia and Melanesia.

Description
Orchids in the genus Dienia are evergreen, sympodial, mostly terrestrial plants with fleshy, above-ground stems, although a few species are epiphytes. There are between three and six relatively large, thin, pleated leaves with their petioles wrapped around the stem. Small, non-resupinate flowers are borne along the end of the flowering stem. The flowers are green, brown, yellow, pink, or purple and have narrow sepals and petals. The sepals are oblong to egg-shaped and spread widely and the petals are usually narrower than the sepals. The labellum is relatively short with three lobes, the middle lobe tongue-like and the side lobes shorter and broad.

Taxonomy and naming
The genus Dienia was first formally described in 1824 by John Lindley and the description was published in The Botanical Register. The name Dienia is derived from the Ancient Greek word dienos meaning "two years", referring to the stems which last for two years.

List of species
The following is a list of species of Dienia recognised by the World Checklist of Selected Plant Families as at October 2018:
 Dienia carinata Rchb.f.
 Dienia cylindrostachya Lindl.
 Dienia ophrydis (J.Koenig) Seidenf.
 Dienia shuicae (S.S.Ying) T.P.Lin
 Dienia truncicola (Schltr.) M.A.Clem. & D.L.Jones
 Dienia volkensii (Schltr.) M.A.Clem. & D.L.Jones

Distribution
Dienia are found in the Philippines, Sumatra, China, the Indian subcontinent, East Asia, Malesia, New Guinea and Australia.

References

 
Malaxideae genera
Terrestrial orchids
Orchids of Asia
Orchids of Oceania